The European Pharmaceutical Students' Association (EPSA) is a non-profit, non-governmental, non-political and non-religious umbrella association of 45 Pharmaceutical Students' Associations from 36 countries, representing over 100.000 pharmaceutical students across Europe. Its main objective is to develop the interests and opinions of European pharmaceutical students and to encourage contact and collaboration between them. EPSA's motto '"Bringing Pharmacy, Knowledge and Students Together" reflects its will to promote the ideas and opinions of all European pharmaceutical students in order to improve the Education, the Pharmaceutical Profession and the Scientific Advances regarding Pharmacy.
EPSA has its headquarters in Brussels, Belgium, in PGEU's offices. The Vice President of External Affairs works permanently there, collaborating with the Pharmaceutical Group of the European Union in the promotion of the role of the pharmacist as the key actor in public health. Before being settled in Brussels, EPSA had its headquarters in Leiden, The Netherlands.

History

In the spring of 1978, the "Association Nationale des Etudiants en Pharmacie de France" (ANEPF) invited a group of students from various European countries to their congress held in Nancy. The reason for this meeting was to discuss the, at the time, forthcoming European Community (EC) directives on the mutual recognition of pharmacy diplomas within the European Community and compare pharmacy curricula in the different countries.
During the meeting, it became obvious that the task at hand was more complicated than anticipated and that results would be difficult to obtain within a short time. However, all participants agreed on the necessity of having discussions and agreements on these topics.
The students, therefore, proposed to the International Pharmaceutical Students' Federation (IPSF) to establish a committee, the European Sub-Committee of IPSF, to deal with these topics. The European Sub-Committee (ESC) was thus established at the 1978 IPSF Congress in Edinburgh.
In 1982 the ESC became an independent organisation, the European Pharmaceutical Students' Committee, which was officially registered at the Tribunal d'Illkirch, France. The main purpose of the ESC was to work towards diploma equivalence with a view to the free movement of pharmacists within the EC. The subject was approached from different angles and the curricula were compared, however, this proved to be difficult since the names of subjects differed between countries. Nevertheless, a lot of data was collected about the studies in the different countries and a paper titled: 'Pharmacy in Europe, Facts of Pharmacy Education and Practice in European Countries' was produced.
The current name of the European Pharmaceutical Students' Association (EPSA) was decided upon ten years after becoming independent, at the 15th ESC congress held in Helsinki in 1992, and took effect from the closure of the 16th ESC Congress, held in Tübingen, Germany, in April 1993.
EPSA underwent dramatic changes during the 27th EPSA Annual Congress in Pamporovo, Bulgaria, in 2004. Timo Mohnani, EPSA President at the time, and his EPSA Executive initiated these changes. The main purpose of the changes was to bring EPSA as an association closer to its members.
This was done by the introduction of Working Committees which consisted of a representative from each member association and worked on a different field of action within the vastness of the pharmaceutical profession. The makeup of the EPSA Executive was only slightly changed with the introduction of a Sponsorship Officer and an EU Officer.
In 2005 EPSA launched a major project – the Individual Mobility Project (IMP). The main aim was to give students the possibility of having paid internships in pharmaceutical companies, research laboratories or any other fields within the pharmacy profession. This project leads to the creation of the positions of Students Mobility Officer, Central IMP Coordinator and the IMP Board.
Later, in 2008, the names given to the EPSA Executive were changed from "Officers" to "Vice Presidents". The structure of the EPSA Executive became the following: President, Secretary General, Treasurer, Vice President of Education, Vice President of Communication, Vice President of Partnership Development, Vice President of EU Affairs and Vice President of Mobility.
2009 presented the creation of two new positions: Training Officer and Alumni Officer. At the 39th EPSA General Assembly held in Kraków, Poland, in April 2010, an internal restructuring was made within EPSA: the abolition of Working Committees led to the creation of the Educational Board; the Vice President of Partnership Development and the Vice President of EU Affairs positions were merged into one: Vice President of External Affairs.
Another change was made by 43rd EPSA General Assembly which renamed all Officers to Coordinators.
In 2014, at the 47th EPSA General Assembly in Budapest, Hungary, a major change was the establishment of a new position in the EPSA Executive - Vice President of Internal Affairs, which became responsible for the internal communication and effectively became the Vice President of the Association.
At the 51st General Assembly, which took place in Helsinki, in April 2016, some other significant changes were made. The position of Vice President of Mobility and the Mobility Department were abolished and a new position in the External Relations Department, the Mobility Coordinator, was created. The Vice President of External Affairs portfolio was also divided by two new positions: Vice President of European Affairs and Vice President of External Relations. The Vice President of External Relations became the leader of the External Relations Department, composed by the Mobility Coordinator, Central IMP Coordinator (that were members of the previous Mobility Department) and Professional Affairs Coordinator (that was previously in the Educational Department). With this new position of Vice President of External Relations, the Partnership Coordinator position was also abolished, becoming part of VP ER's portfolio.
At the 55th General Assembly, which took place in Baarlo, the Netherlands, a European Affairs Department was established. The department is headed by the Vice President of European Affairs and consist of the Grant Coordinator and the newly established Policy Affairs Coordinator. In addition to this, the position of the Social Media Coordinator as part of the Public Relations Department was established.
Today, EPSA represents 100.00 pharmaceutical students from 45 Member Associations and 37 countries. The Association continues to grow and evolve; traditions have developed over the years and are continually created. By agreeing to become an EPSA Liaison Secretary you are continuing one of the oldest and following a long line of dedicated and respected EPSA Members.
The original objectives of EPSA were established in 1982 and were expanded and updated at the 21st EPSA Congress in Alcalá de Henares (Madrid), Spain, in 1998, when the whole structure and running of EPSA was revamped.
The current vision and mission of the association, adopted during the 38th EPSA Annual Congress in Toulouse, France, in 2015, are simple:
"The vision of the association is to represent, reach and engage every single pharmaceutical student in Europe to collaborate on the development of the future of pharmacy and healthcare together."
"The mission of the association is to actively engage at student and professional level, bringing pharmacy, knowledge and students together while promoting personal development."
The EPSA TORSO (Terms of Reference and Standing Orders) exists to ensure that these aims are fulfilled and that the association runs in an appropriate way.

Structure

General Assembly
The EPSA General Assembly (GA) is the highest authority and decision-making body of the Association. Each Ordinary and Associate Member sends up to two Official Delegates to the GA. The GA consists of delegates from all Ordinary and Associate Members of EPSA who speak on behalf of their associations. Observers, such as EPSA Alumni and representatives from other student associations EPSA is collaborating with may also be present at the GA. The voting results and decisions taken at the GA evaluate and define the work of the association and mandate the EPSA Executive to carry out various tasks. The General Assembly takes place two times a year - during the EPSA Annual Congress and the EPSA Autumn Assembly. During the Autumn Assembly, EPSA Team Members present their work for the first half of their mandate and get feedback and suggestions from the members, thus shaping the next half of the year. At the Annual Congress, a new Team is elected/appointed every year.

EPSA Team
The EPSA Team is elected by the General Assembly every year at the EPSA Annual Congress in April or May and takes office in July. Led by the Executive, the EPSA Team cooperates all year with EPSA Member Associations in order to achieve EPSA goals.

Executive

The EPSA Executive manages the affairs of the Association and leads the work done in the name of EPSA in multiple fields.

The European Sub-Committee (ESC) began with only one executive member, the chairperson. However, as the workload increased, the need for additional board members became apparent. The ESC board was originally elected at IPSF Congresses. However, from 1982 onward, due to the division of IPSF and ECS, the Executive has been elected at ESC Congresses. Until 1998, the Board (composed of President, Vice-President, Secretary and Treasurer) was elected at the Congress, and the rest of the Executive appointed. From 1998 onwards the entire Executive was elected at the Congress and was assisted by a number of sub-committees.

After that, several changes were made in the Executive with the introduction of Vice-Presidents and Immediate Past President positions. The actual structure of the EPSA Executive is composed of 8 elected members and one appointed Immediate Past President.

President (president@epsa-online.org) – his main duty is to coordinate all activities of the Association. The President is the leader and the stimulator of all EPSA Team Members. He is also responsible for contacts with external bodies — professional, governmental and other students’ organisations. The President leads EPSA forward to grow and flourish in benefit and influence and ensure continuity of the projects and endeavours.

Secretary General (secgen@epsa-online.org) — he is responsible for maintaining all documents in EPSA. This task encompasses keeping minutes of the General Assembly and other meetings in EPSA, collecting reports and preparing GA documents, as well as managing the EPSA Library and EPSA Archives.

Publications

Newsletter
The EPSA Newsletter is the official EPSA publication. It is published two times a year and is distributed to all EPSA members, contact organisations and sponsors. The Newsletter contains articles from the EPSA Officials, members and professionals and aims to spread EPSA's latest developments regarding its projects and to exchange knowledge and experiences between them. Including a broad variety of topics, it also contributes to the communication between students of member countries, who want to share ideas, comments and experiences. Additionally, it serves to highlight the important issues for pharmaceutical students across Europe and to pass information about future events. Each EPSA Member Association receives copies of the Newsletter that are further distributed to students across Europe, as well as to EPSA Observers and professional associations.

Monthly Dose
The EPSA Monthly Dose aims to bring relevant and useful updates about EPSA to students that are not very familiar with the Association. It is published every month by the EPSA Publications Coordinator and contains information about relevant projects in EPSA and its Member Associations, upcoming events and recently published blog articles and publications. The Monthly Dose is sent by e-mail to all students, teachers and professionals that subscribe to it on the EPSA website and is also available as a printed version at the European faculties of pharmacy.

ESSP (EPSA Students’ Science Publication)
The ESSP collects and publishes EPSA members’ abstracts of their scientific work. All abstracts are reviewed by EUFEPS (European Federation for Pharmaceutical Sciences) so students receive professional feedback, It is published three times per year.

References

External links

Medical and health organisations based in Belgium
European student organizations
Student organisations in Belgium
Pharmacy-related professional associations